Munshi Muhammad Sadeq Ali, born as Sri Gaur Kishore Sen,  was a prominent Dobhashi writer, poet and district judge from 19th century Bengal. He is considered to be the most well-known writer to have used the Sylheti Nagri script and this is due to his magnum opus, Halat-un-Nabi (Condition of the Prophet), which gained immense popularity in the Sylhet region and would later be transcribed in the Bengali script.

Early life
Shree Gour Kishore Sen was born around 1800.

In August 1818, he was taught the basics of Islam by Maulvi Muhammad Yusuf. Sen grew an interest in the Arabic and Persian languages, and so he studied under Mir Munshi Abul Fazl, a detective of the Hingazia thana.

He formally accepted Islam and changed his name to Sadeq Ali. He also mentions that he was a follower of the Hanafi madhhab.

Career as a writer

Sadeq Ali decided to take a reformist stance against the common Sylheti Muslim literature which had used religious syncretism with Hinduism, in particular Vaishnavism, and Sufi Baul elements. Sadeq Ali then published his Mahabbatnama based on the story of Yusuf and Zulaikha taking inspiration from the earlier version by Shah Gharibullah of West Bengal. He also wrote Hashor Michhil (Procession of Hashr), which also remains in circulation, continuing to be sold in shops in both Sylheti Nagri and Bengali scripts. as well as Radd al-Hind (Response to the Hindus), Kashf al-Bid'ah (Unveiling of Innovation), Pandenama, Dafeh al-Hujat, Hushiarnama and Rahasatul Islam.

Sadeq Ali later composed another puthi about the prophetic biography called Halat-un-Nabi in 1855, focusing more on scripture rather than more popular folk beliefs. It became a household item in every Bengali Muslim homestead in Greater Sylhet and Cachar, making it the most popular and widely printed book in the Sylheti Nagri script. Sadeq Ali wrote Radd-i-Kufr in 1874.

Death and legacy
Long after Sadeq Ali's death in 1862, the Bangladesh Liberation War took place in 1971. A fire took place in Bandar Bazar, Sylhet town destroying the Islamia Press, which was the largest Sylheti Nagri printing press. However, Bengali script versions of the Halat-un-Nabi puthi continued to be in production and circulation. The puthi was included in the Nagri Grantha Sambhar, a selection of Nagri puthis published by Utsho Prokashon in 2014.

See also
Heyat Mahmud

References

1798 births
People from Kulaura Upazila
19th-century Indian Muslims
Bengali-language poets
19th-century Indian male writers
Bengali male poets
19th-century Bengali poets
Muslim poets
1862 deaths